"Me, Myself & I" is a song by Australian pop group Scandal'us. It was released as the debut single from their album Startin' Somethin' and reached number one on the Australia ARIA Singles Chart in 2001, staying there for three weeks. It was the country's 15th-most-successful hit of 2001 and received a double-platinum sales certification. At the ARIA Music Awards of 2001, the song won Highest Selling Single.

Track listings
Australian maxi-CD single 1
 "Me, Myself & I" (single mix) – 3:10
 "Me, Myself & I" (Funk Corporation remix) – 3:49
 "Me, Myself & I" (Mayday vs. Cadell – High Energy mix) – 3:32
 "Me, Myself & I" (karaoke mix) – 3:08

Australian maxi-CD single 2 (Festival Mushroom 020312)
 "Me, Myself & I" (single mix) – 3:06
 "Me, Myself & I" (RnB mix) – 3:22
 "Me, Myself & I" (Mayday vs. Cadell – High Energy mix) – 3:29
 "Me, Myself & I" (karaoke mix) – 3:06

Charts

Weekly charts

Year-end charts

Certifications

In popular culture
The original version of this song was recorded by the winners of series one of PopStars in Sweden, Excellence, although it was not released as a single. In 2011, the Excellence version was featured in the gym scene of the film Final Destination 5.

References

2001 singles
2001 songs
ARIA Award-winning songs
Number-one singles in Australia
Warner Music Group singles